Al-Qantara Mosque, also known as Al-Madhoun Mosque or Qabil Mosque is a now abandoned 19th century Ottoman-era historical mosque in the al-Mathnah neighborhood of Ta’if, Saudi Arabia. Built during the time of Sharif Abd al-Muttalib ibn Ghalib, the mosque is believed to be constructed upon one of the sites where Prophet Muhammad and Zayd ibn Harithah took rest in an orchard while on their way back to Mecca in the aftermath of their expulsion by the leaders and residents of Ta’if in around 620 during the Year of Sorrow.

Pilgrims travelling to Mecca to perform Hajj and Umrah often pay visits and offer prayers in the mosque.

Background 

After Taif's tribal leaders and residents rejected the message of Prophet Muhammad, they ordered their children to throw rock and stones at him and Zayd ibn Harithah. Both Muhammad and Zayd were badly injured and started bleeding as a result. Once outside the walls of Taif, Muhammad almost collapsed.

After travelling for a short distance, they stopped in an orchard that belonged to Utaba and Sheba. The owners of the orchard had seen Muhammad being persecuted in Mecca and on this occasion they felt some sympathy toward their fellow townsman. The owners of the orchard sent a slave, named Addas, a young Christian boy who took Muhammad into his hut, dressed his wounds, and let him rest and recuperate until he felt strong enough to resume his journey across the rough terrain between Ta’if and Mecca.

History 
The mosque is said to have been constructed during the reign of Sharif Abd al-Muttalib ibn Ghalib in mid 19th century, when Taif used to be part of the Habesh Eyalet of the Ottoman Empire. It derives its name from the al-Madhoun mountain.

References

External links 

Mosques in At-Ta'if